is a Japanese voice actress and singer affiliated with Early Wing. She debuted as a voice actress in 1999 and as singer in 2009 by releasing her first single "Day by Day / Shining Blue Rain" under the 5pb. Records label. She is also well known for giving voices to Chihaya Kisaragi in THE IDOLM@STER (all related productions, except for IDOM@STER: Xenoglossia), Kurisu Makise in Steins;Gate, Tsubaki Yayoi in BlazBlue, and Ayumi Shinozaki in Corpse Party. She along with Eri Kitamura formed the music unit Artery Vein which is also under the 5pb. label.

Biography

Early life
Born in Tokyo in 1977, Imai moved from Shibuya to Tokuyama City (currently Shūnan City) in Yamaguchi Prefecture, when she was eight years old. However, it is stated in her official profile that she was born in Yamaguchi Prefecture. She has stated that she graduated from Tokuyama High School, was vagabond for around a year, before entering Meiji University's School of Arts and Letters, majoring in Drama and Theatre Arts.
In late April 2020, she uploaded her Youtube channel.

Career
In 1998, Imai won the Grand Prize for the Voice Actress category at the ENIX Anime Awards (エニックスアニメ大賞) while she was still studying. Subsequently, she debuted in the following year in the drama CD Toki no Daichi〜Hana no Ōkoku no Majo〜. In 2001, she was chosen as an assistant of the radio show, Tomokazu・Miki's Radio Big Bang.
At one point of time in 2006, Imai once thought of giving up her job as a voice actress, but could not bear to leave the voice acting of her role as Chihaya Kisaragi in The Idolmaster to others.

Imai left her agency ArtsVision on April 5, 2007. She then free-lanced under the agency Kaleidoscope for 7 months.
On April 22, 2009, Imai released her first major debut single, "Day by Day / Shining Blue Rain" under the 5pb. Records label. In the same year, she transferred to her current agency, Early Wing on December 1.
She landed her first lead role as Kiiko Kawakami in the OVA Kuttsukiboshi in 2010. As she began expanding her singing career, she held her first solo live concert on December 25, 2010, and has since held concerts around the period of her birthday in May, as well as December.

On April 18, 2012, Imai was awarded the Best Female Character Voice award at the Famitsu Awards in 2011.

Imai is one of two members of the musical duo Artery Vein, along with Eri Kitamura. The unit mainly performs theme songs for the Corpse Party series. Imai's song "World-Line" is used as the second ending theme to the 2018 anime series Steins;Gate 0. Her song "Believe in Sky" was used as the opening theme to the 2019 anime series Pastel Memories.

Filmography

Animation

Film

Live action
Ultraseven X (2007): Soul of Light (ep 6.)

Video games

Drama CD

Dubbing
The Summit of the Gods (Ryoko Kishi)

Discography

Asami Imai

Solo Singles
 "Day by Day /Shining Blue Rain", released April 22, 2009
 "Strawberry 〜Amaku Setsunai Namida〜", released October 21, 2009
 "Horizon", released April 21, 2010
 "Shangri-La", released July 22, 2010
 "Frame Goshi no Koi", released February 23, 2011
 "Enrai", released May 25, 2011
 "Hana no Saku Basho", released August 3, 2011
 "Hasta La Vista", released April 25, 2012
 "Limited Love", released July 25, 2012
 "Dear Darling", released March 27, 2013
 "Hoshikuzu no Ring", released June 26, 2013
 "Shikkoku no Sustain", released March 26, 2014
 "Tsuioku no Itoguruma", released July 30, 2014
 "Venus no Harmonia", released August 27, 2014
 "Asayake no Starmine", released June 3, 2015
 "BABYLON 〜 before the daybreak", released July 22, 2015
 "Sabaku no Ame", released July 27, 2016
 "Reunion -Once Again-", released October 26, 2016
 "World-Line", released August 29, 2018
 "Niji", released September 9, 2018 (Fan-club single)
 "Believe in Sky", releases January 30, 2019
 "Kimi no Koe no Kazu dake ~Can be strong~", released August 26, 2020 (Fan-club single)

Mini-Albums
 "Flow of Time", released November 27, 2019

Solo albums
 "COLOR SANCTUARY", released November 23, 2010
 "Aroma of happiness", released November 30, 2011
 "Precious Sounds", released November 28, 2012
 "Kono Kumo no Hate", released November 27, 2013
 "little legacy", released November 26, 2014
 "Words of GRACE", released February 24, 2016
 "rinascita", released May 16, 2017
 "Gene of the earth", released November 25, 2020
 "Balancing Journey", released December 22, 2021

ARTERY VEIN

Singles
 "Confutatis no Inori", released August 25, 2010
 "Last Judgement", released April 20, 2011
 "Pandora no Yoru", released August 24, 2011
 "Kagerou", released August 8, 2012

Albums
 "ARTERY VEIN", released March 7, 2012

References

External links

  at 5pb records. 
  at 5pb. records 
 

1977 births
Living people
Anime singers
Japanese video game actresses
Japanese voice actresses
Meiji University alumni
Singers from Tokyo
Voice actresses from Tokyo
21st-century Japanese actresses
21st-century Japanese singers
21st-century Japanese women singers
Japanese YouTubers